Jacques Chevallier may refer to:

 Jacques Chevallier (politician) (1911–1971), French-Algerian industrialist and politician
 Jacques Le Chevallier, French glassmaker and decorative artist
 Jacques Chevallier (engineer) (1921–2009), French naval engineer and defence civil servant

See also
 Jacques Chevalier (1882–1962), French Catholic philosopher and politician